Aktion Leben (full name aktion leben österreich) is an anti-abortion organization in Austria.

Information
Aktion Leben is an organization that offers counselling and aid for pregnant women. They also educate adolescents and adults through illustrations and pictures in hopes of getting them to make anti-abortion decisions. For an effort to educate younger children, they have produced games for them. The organization plays as the anti-abortion voice in politics and in the public. organization advises and assists women and families that are due to an unplanned pregnancy that might possibly be in a crisis. They also offer sex education for modern children and adolescents. There are also various adult training courses. There are materials that are also available to those who want them. The materials have an influence that allow people to value life and it includes the following:
brochures
teaching materials
educational games

Networks
Aktion Leben has connections with the following organizations:
International Society of Prenatal and Perinatal Psychology and Medicine (ISPPM)
Prenet - Netzwerk für kritische Auseinandersetzung mit Pränataldiagnostik (Network for critical evaluation of prenatal diagnosis)
Network for interdisciplinary health promotion around pregnancy, birth and early childhood

References

External links 
 Homepage of aktion leben österreich

Anti-abortion organisations in Austria